Э э (Э э; italics: Э э; also known as backwards ye, from Russian , ye oborótnoye) is a letter found in three Slavic languages: Russian, Belarusian, and West Polesian. This letter closely resembles and should not be confused with the older Cyrillic letter Ukrainian Ye (Є є), of which Э is a reversed version.

In Cyrillic Moldovan, which was used in the Moldovan SSR during the Soviet Union and is still used in Transnistria, the letter corresponds to ă in the Latin Romanian alphabet, and the phoneme [ə]. It is also used in the Cyrillic alphabets used by Mongolian and many Uralic, Caucasian and Turkic languages of the former Soviet Union.

Origin
According to Yefim Karskiy, "Western Russian ustav knows , e.g. in Miscellany of the 15th c. from the Public Library (manuscr. #391) ( etc.), chronicles of 15th-16th cc., Miscellany of Poznań (16th c.), Statut of 1588... It is difficult to say whether it has been developed here independently or it came from South Slavic manuscripts, where  occurs as early as in 13-14th cc." It was by no means confined to this function in the period, however, as the prevalent spellings  (beside ) for modern Russian ,  demonstrate.

In modern Russian

The former was used in some early 18th-century Russian texts, but some authorities of the period considered it superfluous, like Mikhail Lomonosov, on the grounds that "the letter Е, having several different pronunciations, could serve in the pronoun  and the interjection " and that it was inappropriate to introduce letters solely for use in loanwords.

There were still some objections to the letter even as late as 1817, when M. T. Kačenovskij was questioning whether "yet another hard э" was necessary when the language already had "a soft ѣ and a hard е".

In contemporary Russian,  is used to represent ,  in initial position ( 'electricity') and postvocalic position ( 'duel'). Among such words are only a few native Russian roots:  (это 'this is', этот/эта/это 'this (m./f./n.)', эти 'these', поэтому 'thus' etc.),  (экий 'what a'), / (эдак/этак 'that way', эдакий/этакий 'sort of') and a few interjections like  'hey',  'uh, oh',  'uh'. 

There are few traditional exceptions to that practice among common noun loanwords:
 the original list (the first half of the 20th century) contained just three words:
  'mayor', from French 
  'peer (a noble)', from French 
  'sir', from English or from Old French 
 two later additions (1950s-1960s):
  'master, skilled artist', from French 
 , from French 
 new additions (1980s and later) are more numerous:
  'racket, racketeering', from English
  'rap (music)', from English
  'fantasy (literature)', from English
 and several others; spelling of new words sometimes varies and dictionaries often give variants or contradict one another (like  'hatchback (car)' in spelling dictionary vs / in explanatory dictionary).

In proper nouns, however,  may occur after consonants:  'Ulan-Ude' and  'Blair'. However, many such loanwords are spelled with :  'Blériot' (a French aviator). That is the case especially for names that entered the language centuries ago like: , 'Berlin'.

The letter  is also used in Russian to render initial œ in foreign words: thus  (the river in France) is written . In the 19th century, some writers used  for that sound in both positions, but that was never accepted as standard orthography. (The letter  was re-invented in the 20th century for Kildin Sami.) It is also used to represent a stressed  in languages such as English, which can cause a problem of conflating  with English  (for example, "Addison" and "Edison" would be spelled the same).

In modern Belarusian
Unlike Russian, Belarusian has many native words in which it occurs after a hard consonant. Moreover, its orthography was standardized later than that of Russian (which reached its present form at the beginning of the 20th century), on the basis of the spoken language rather than historical tradition. That also means that  is much more frequent in Belarusian than in Russian.

In other languages
In Tuvan the Cyrillic letter can be written as a double vowel.

In the Tajik language, the letters е and э have the same function, except that э is used at the beginning of a word (ex. Эрон, "Iran").

In Mongolian, э is the standard letter to represent the /ɛ/ phoneme. It is often written doubled to represent the /eː/ phoneme. Е, however, is only used in the few Mongolian words containing it, Russian loanwords and Russian-style transcriptions of foreign names.

Related letters and other similar characters
 Е е : Cyrillic letter Ye
 Є є : Cyrillic letter Ukrainian Ye
 Ε ε : Greek letter Epsilon
 E e : Latin letter E
 É é : Latin letter E with acute
 Ė ė : Latin letter E with overdot - a Lithuanian letter
 ℈ : Scruple (Apothecaries' system)

Computing codes

References

External links

Vowel letters